"I Wouldn't Believe Your Radio" is the fourth single released from Welsh rock band Stereophonics' second studio album, Performance and Cocktails (1999), on which the song appears as the seventh track. The single was released in August 1999 and reached number 11 on the UK Singles Chart. A live version from Morfa Stadium is present on CD2 of the single. A version with Stuart Cable singing vocals can be found on CD1 on the "Hurry Up and Wait" single.

Background
In the album booklet for Performance and Cocktails, vocalist Kelly Jones revealed that he wrote the song in August 1997 after waking up from a dream. In the dream, George Harrison and Ringo Starr of the Beatles were singing "I Wouldn't Believe Your Radio" in front of Jones' parents' house. Jones also said that he originally wanted drummer Stuart Cable to sing the track so they could "keep the Ringo theme going".

Music video
The video was inspired as an homage to the cult 1969 road film Easy Rider. It shows the band as characters from the film, making a road trip through America on motorbikes.

Track listings

UK CD1
 "I Wouldn't Believe Your Radio" (single version)
 "The Bartender and the Thief" (bar version)
 "The Old Laughing Lady"

UK CD2
 "I Wouldn't Believe Your Radio" (live at Morfa Stadium)
 "Pick a Part That's New" (live at Morfa Stadium)
 "T-Shirt Suntan" (live at Morfa Stadium)

UK 7-inch and cassette single
 "I Wouldn't Believe Your Radio" (single version)
 "The Bartender and the Thief" (bar version)

Japanese CD single
 "I Wouldn't Believe Your Radio" (single version)
 "The Bartender and the Thief" (bar version)
 "Sunny Afternoon"
 "Positively 4th Street"
 "Tie Me Up, Tie Me Down"

Credits and personnel
Credits are taken from the Performance and Cocktails album booklet.

Recording
 Written in August 1997
 Recorded at Real World (Bath, Somerset, England)
 Mastered at Metropolis (London, England)

Personnel

 Kelly Jones – music, lyrics, vocals, guitar
 Richard Jones – music, bass
 Stuart Cable – music, drums
 Marshall Bird – keyboards
 Bird & Bush – production
 Al Clay – mixing
 Ian Cooper – mastering

Charts

References

1997 songs
1999 singles
Songs about radio
Songs written by Kelly Jones
V2 Records singles